The 2018–19 Wellington Phoenix season was the club's 12th season since its establishment in 2007. The club participated in the A-League for the 12th time, the FFA Cup for the fifth time, and fielded a reserves squad in the ISPS Handa Premiership for the fifth time.

Review
This season marked the club surpassing its record of 7 games unbeaten to 9 games unbeaten. Roy Krishna became Wellington Phoenix's all time leading goal scorer overtaking Paul Ifill's record of 33 and also broke the record for most goals in a single season for the club with 19. The club also broke its record of biggest home attendance for a non-final match with 23,648 people against Melbourne Victory in Eden Park on 15 February 2019. This season was the first time since 2015 the Phoenix played in the Finals Series. However, they lost 3-1 in the elimination final to Melbourne Victory.

Players

Squad information

From youth squad

Transfers in

Transfers out

Contract extensions

Technical staff

Squad statistics

Appearances and goals

|-
|colspan="14"|Players no longer at the club:

† = Scholarship or reserves-listed player

Pre-season and friendlies

Competitions

Overall

A-League

League table

Results summary

Results by round

Matches

Finals series

FFA Cup

References

External links
 Official website

2018–19 A-League season by team
Wellington Phoenix FC seasons